The Music Lesson is an oil painting by Frederic Leighton, first exhibited in 1877.

History 
In the 1877 Exhibition of the Royal Academy of Arts the most striking picture was from Leighton's studio, and was called The Music Lesson. Early in 1878 Leighton was appointed President of the Jury on Paintings at the Paris International Exhibition, to which Exhibition he contributed Elijah in the Wilderness, The Music Lesson, and Captain Richard Burton, H.M.'s Consul at Trieste.

Analysis 
Edgcumbe Staley admired the composition:

Ernest Rhys praised the beauty of the colouring:

See also 

 Academic art
 Orientalism

References

Sources 

 Ash, Russell (1995). Lord Leighton. London: Pavilion Books Limited. p. 53 [Plate 19].
 Jones, Stephen, et al. (1996). Frederic Leighton, 1830–1896. Royal Academy of Arts, London: Harry N. Abrams, Inc. pp. 147, 179, 185, 203.
 Rhys, Ernest (1900). Frederic Lord Leighton: An Illustrated Record of his Life and Work. London: George Bell & Sons. pp. 36–37, 126.
 Staley, Edgcumbe (1906). Lord Leighton of Stretton. London: The Walter Scott Publishing Co., Ltd.; New York: Charles Scribner's Sons. pp. 107–108, 110, 112.
 "The Music Lesson". The Victorian Web. 8 February 2015. Accessed 2 July 2022.

1877 paintings
Paintings by Frederic Leighton